Veer is a 1995 Indian action film directed by Kanti Shah and produced by Surekha Gawli. It stars Dharmendra, Jaya Pradha, Gautami and Armaan Kohli in lead roles.

Plot 
The film revolves with the life of Veer, a patriotic person who fights against the underworld.

Cast
Dharmendra as Veer
Jaya Prada as Rani
Armaan Kohli as Arjun
Gautami as Commissioner's daughter
Kader Khan as Agarwal / Advocate Vishwanath 
Mukesh Khanna as Tiger
Goga Kapoor as Police Commissioner
Kiran Kumar as Inspector Amar Mukhtar 
Deepak Shirke as Chikoo Tandia 
Rami Reddy
Tiku Talsania

Music
The music of the film is composed by duo of Sameer Sen and Dilip Sen while lyrics are penned by Faiz Anwar, Rani Malik, Poonam, Shyam Anuragi and Maya Govind.

References

External links 

1990s Hindi-language films
1995 films
Films scored by Dilip Sen-Sameer Sen
Indian action films
Films directed by Kanti Shah